Alisimitra fuscolineata is a species of sea snail, a marine gastropod mollusk, in the family Costellariidae, the ribbed miters.

References

External links
 Fedosov A.E., Puillandre N., Herrmann M., Dgebuadze P. & Bouchet P. (2017). Phylogeny, systematics, and evolution of the family Costellariidae (Gastropoda: Neogastropoda). Zoological Journal of the Linnean Society. 179(3): 541-626., page(s): 580, figs 12A-C, 13A

fuscolineata
 Gastropods described in 2012